The Slovak Ground Forces, also known as the Slovak Army, is the land specialized service branch of the Slovak Armed Forces.

Structure

Ground Forces Command
 Ground Forces Command, in Trenčín (Commander: 2 Star General)
 Command Support Battalion
 Headquarters Company
 Transport Company
 Medical Point
 Deployable CIS Base 
 Main Training Base, in Martin

1st Mechanized Brigade 

 1st Mechanized Brigade, in Topoľčany (Commander: 1 Star General)
 Command Support Company, in Topoľčany
 11th Mechanized Battalion, in Martin equipped with BVP-2 
 Headquarters Company
 3x Mechanized Companies (each with 3x Mechanized Platoons and 1x Fire Support Platoon)
 Fire Support Company (Anti-Tank Platoon- KONKURS on BRDM-2, Recon Platoon & 98mm Mortar Platoon) 
 12th Mechanized Battalion, in Nitra equipped with BVP-2  
 Headquarters Company
 3x Mechanized Companies (each with 3x Mechanized Platoons and 1x Fire Support Platoon)
 Fire Support Company (Anti-Tank Platoon- KONKURS mounted on OT-90, Recon Platoon & 98mm Mortar Platoon) 
 13th Mechanized Battalion, in Levice equipped with BVP-2
 Headquarters Company 
 3x Mechanized Companies (each with 3x Mechanized Platoons and 1x Fire Support Platoon)
 Fire Support Company (Anti-Tank Platoon- KONKURS mounted on OT-90, Recon Platoon & 98mm Mortar Platoon) 
 Rocket Battalion, in Rožňava
 Headquarters Battery
 3x MLRS RM-70/85 Modular Batteries
 Engineer Battalion, in Sereď
 Headquarters Company
 2x Pontoon Bridge Companies
 2x Technical Engineer Companies
 2x Combat Engineer Companies
 Mine Warfare Company
 NBC Defence Battalion, in Rožňava
 Headquarters Company
 NBC Recon Company 
 2x Decontamination Companies
 2x NBC Defence Companies
 Medical Company

2nd Mechanized Brigade 

 2nd Mechanized Brigade, in Prešov (Commander: 1 Star General)
 Command Support Company, in Prešov
 Tank Battalion, in Trebišov equipped with T-72M1
  21st Mechanized Battalion, in Trebišov equipped with BVP-1
 Headquarters Company
 3x Mechanized Companies (each with 3x Mechanized Platoons and 1x Fire Support Platoon)
 Fire Support Company (Anti-Tank Platoon- KONKURS mounted on OT-90, Recon Platoon & 82mm Mortar Platoon)
 22nd Mechanized Battalion, in Michalovce equipped with BVP-1
 Headquarters Company
 3x Mechanized Companies (each with 3x Mechanized Platoons and 1x Fire Support Platoon)
 Fire Support Company (Anti-Tank Platoon- KONKURS mounted on OT-90, Recon Platoon & 98mm Mortar Platoon)
 Self-propelled Artillery Battalion, in Michalovce
 Headquarters Battery
 2x 155mm Self Propelled Howitzer "Zuzana" Batteries
 ISTAR Battalion, in Prešov equipped with BPsV-I

Combat Service Support Brigade 
 Combat Service Support Brigade, in Trenčín (Commander: 1 Star General)
 Command Support Company, in Trenčín 
 Logistic Battalion, in Hlohovec
 Logistic Battalion, in Topoľčany
 Maintenance Battalion, in Martin
 CSS Battalion, in Prešov

Equipment

References

External links
Official Homepage of the Ground Forces of the Slovak Republic Armed Forces

Military of Slovakia
 
Military units and formations of Slovakia
1993 establishments in Slovakia
Military units and formations established in 1993